British Settlement is a community in Westmorland County, New Brunswick about eight kilometres southwest of Sackville.

History

Notable people

See also
List of communities in New Brunswick

References

Communities in Westmorland County, New Brunswick